The following is a list of county roads in Palm Beach County, Florida.  Roads are maintained locally by the Palm Beach County Engineering and Public Works Department. Nearly every route in this list is a former state road since decommissioned by the Florida Department of Transportation. Most routes are signed using standard county road shields, but some are unsigned on streets.

County Road A1A

County Road A1A is a former routing of SR A1A through Juno Beach and Jupiter. It serves as a paralleling alternate route to Federal Highway (US 1), running parallel to the Atlantic Ocean. CR A1A is often signed as "SR A1A" in green street signs despite county designation shields and maintenance. The road is known as Ocean Drive in Juno Beach and Ocean Boulevard in Jupiter, and is closed to through trucks.

Major intersections

County Road 700

County Road 700 is Connors Highway from an intersection with US 98 / US 441 / SR 80 and SR 700 to CR 880 in Twentymile Bend.

The road is a former routing of US 98, US 441, and SR 700.

Major intersections

County Road 702

County Road 702 is 45th Street from Jog Road to US 1. The road was formerly designated SR 702.

Major intersections

County Road 704A

County Road 704A is Australian Avenue in West Palm Beach. The road is an extension of Congress Avenue (SR 807), and begins just north of an interchange with Southern Boulevard (US 98 / SR 80).  The road terminates at an intersection with Blue Heron Boulevard (SR 708) in Riviera Beach. The road was formerly designated SR 704A.

County Road 706

County Road 706 exists along two sections of Indiantown Road in and around Jupiter. The western segment was formerly designated SR 706, while the eastern segment is an extension of the current state road.

County Road 707

County Road 707 is South Beach Road from US 1 / SR 811 to the Martin County line in Tequesta. It was formerly designated SR 707.

County Road 711

County Road 711 is Pratt Whitney Road from SR 710 west of Palm Beach Gardens north to the Martin County line west of Jupiter. It was formerly designated SR 711.

Major intersections

County Road 717

County Road 717 exists in two segments. The first is a northwestern extension of SR 717 in Belle Glade, connecting SR 715 (Southwest 16th Street) with the Lake Okeechobee Scenic Trail and the Torry Island campground. The second segment begins at SR 729 in Pahokee and travels on Muck City Road east to SR 700 south of Bryant.

Both routes were formerly designated SR 717.

Major intersections

County Road 782

County Road 782 is the unsigned designation for Linton Boulevard in Kings Point and Delray Beach. CR 782's western terminus is at Jog Road (former SR 845) and it travels east to Ocean Boulevard (SR A1A).

The road was formerly designated SR 782.

Major intersections

County Road 792

County Road 792 is the unsigned designation for part of Woolbright Road around Boynton Beach. CR 792 begins at an intersection with Military Trail, which itself is a state-turned-county road. The road's eastern terminus is SR A1A. CR 792 was formerly designated SR 792.

Major intersections

County Road 794

County Road 794 is an unsigned extension of SR 794 along Yamato Road within incorporated and unincorporated Boca Raton.

County Road 798

County Road 798 is Palmetto Park Road in unincorporated and incorporated Boca Raton. The road was formerly designated SR 798. CR 798 forms the north–south boundary in the Boca Raton street numbering grid.

The road begins at an intersection with Glades Road (CR 808) outside the city limits and terminates at Ocean Boulevard (SR A1A) within Boca Raton.

Major intersections

County Road 806A

County Road 806A is a short segment of George Bush Boulevard in Delray Beach. The road, formerly SR 806A, begins at an intersection with Federal Highway (US 1) and heads east, bridging the Intracoastal Waterway, to terminate at Ocean Boulevard (SR A1A).

Major intersections

County Road 807

County Road 807 is a southern extension of SR 807 along Congress Avenue. It was formerly designated SR 807.

County Road 808

County Road 808 is a western extension of SR 808 along Glades Road in unincorporated Boca Raton.

County Road 809

County Road 809 is split into two segments of Military Trail that sandwich SR 809. The southern section was formerly a state-maintained road, while the northern is always a county-maintained extension.

County Road 809A

County Road 809A is the designation for Northlake Boulevard in the vicinity of Palm Beach Gardens. It was formerly designated SR 809 west of Military Trail and SR 809A east of it.

County Road 811

County Road 811 comprises a portion of Dixie Highway in West Palm Beach, which itself is a historic auto trail. This segment of the trail was formerly designated SR 811.

County Road 812

County Road 812 is the designation for Lantana Road from southeast of Wellington into Lantana, just south of Lake Worth. The road was formerly designated SR 812.

Major intersections

County Road 827

County Road 827 is the designation for three former segments of SR 827: an unnamed segment south of Belle Glade, Browns Farms Road east of Belle Glade, and Loxahatchee Road near the northern border of Parkland. The original route has since been bisected by the Loxahatchee National Wildlife Refuge.

County Road 827A

County Road 827A is an unnamed road south of Belle Glade, serving as an alternate route to US 27 along with CR 827. The road was formerly designated SR 827A.

Major intersections

County Road 880

County Road 880 is a signed route from Belle Glade to Twentymile Bend. It is a former routing of SR 80 (which now uses the Hooker Highway).

References

External links
FDOT General Highway Map, Palm Beach County

 
County